The 1939-40 Bohemian-Moravian Hockey League season was the first season of the Bohemian-Moravian Hockey League. The Bohemian Championship had been contested the previous year. Four teams participated in the league, and LTC Prag won the championship.

Regular season

External links
 Season on hockeyarchives.info

Bohemian-Moravian Hockey League seasons
Boh